The Plenario Intersindical de Trabajadores – Convención Nacional de Trabajadores (PIT-CNT) is the national trade union center.

References

External links 

Trade unions
Uruguay